The Benin national rugby union team represents Benin in international rugby union. Benin is not a member of the International Rugby Board (IRB), and have yet to play in a Rugby World Cup tournament. 

They have competed in the north section of the CAR Castel Beer Trophy, but last appeared in 2005 being defeated by Togo and Mali and drawing with Niger.

Overall Record

See also
Rugby union in Benin

References

External links

African national rugby union teams
Rugby union in Benin
National sports teams of Benin